Burse is a surname. Notable people with the surname include:

 Charlie Burse (1901–1965), African-American blues musician
 Denise Burse (born 1952), American actress
 Isaiah Burse (born 1991), American football wide receiver
 Janell Burse (born 1979), American, women's basketball player
 Ray Burse (born 1984), American soccer goalkeeper
 Raymond Burse, college administrator, lawyer and businessman
 Tony Burse (born 1965), American football player
 Walter Burse (1898–1970), second president of Suffolk University

See also

 
 
 Corporal (liturgy), which is required to be stored in a case named a burse

 Bourse (disambiguation)
 Bursa
 Purse (disambiguation)